Feng Xinzhu (born July 1960) is a former Chinese politician who served as Vice Governor of Shaanxi. He was dismissed from his position in January 2018 and placed under investigation by the Central Commission for Discipline Inspection. He became the first high-ranking official ("tiger") taken down in the year of 2018.

Career
Feng Xinzhu was born in July 1960, and he was entered to Xi'an Statistics School in 1979. In 1981, he started to work at Shaanxi Township Enterprises Supply And Marketing Company, then he moved to Shaanxi Rural Electricity Administration since 1989, and he promoted to Deputy Director in 1996.

In 2001, Feng was appointed as the Deputy Mayor of Tongchuan, then he promoted to Mayor in 2004. He was appointed as the CPC Committee Secretary of Tongchuan in 2011. 

In 2015, Feng was appointed as the Vice Governor of Shaanxi.

Investigation
On January 3, 2018, Feng was placed under investigation by the Central Commission for Discipline Inspection, the party's internal disciplinary body, for "serious violations of regulations". On January 21, his qualification for delegate to the 12th Shaanxi People's Congress was terminated. He is expelled from the Communist Party and removed from public office on March 31, 2018. "Feng had accumulated a huge amount of assets which it suspected were bribes and promoted officials at the request of private companies", the Central Commission for Discipline Inspection said in a statement on its website.

On January 17, his trial was held at the Intermediate People's Court in the Intermediate People's Court of Hangzhou. Prosecutors accused Feng of taking advantage of his former positions in Shaanxi between 1999 and 2017 to seek profits for certain organizations and individuals in project investment, mineral development, capital lending, project contracting and job adjustment. In return, he accepted money and property worth more than 70.47 million yuan (about 10.41 million U.S. dollars). On May 14, Feng was sentenced on 15 years in prison and fined 7 million yuan ($1.02 million). Feng was charged with accepting bribes worth 70.47 million yuan (about 10.41 million U.S. dollars), by the Intermediate People's Court of Hangzhou.

References

1960 births
Chinese Communist Party politicians from Shaanxi
People's Republic of China politicians from Shaanxi
Political office-holders in Shaanxi
Living people
Politicians from Hanzhong
Expelled members of the Chinese Communist Party
Northwest University (China) alumni